The 2016 Teen Choice Awards ceremony was held on July 31, 2016, at the Forum in Inglewood, California. The awards celebrate the year's achievements in music, film, television, sports, fashion, comedy, and the Internet, and were voted on by viewers living in the US, aged 13 and over through various social media sites. Justin Timberlake received the inaugural Decade Award. The ceremony was hosted by John Cena and Victoria Justice.

Performers
 Flo Rida"My House", "Good Feeling", "Wild Ones" (ft. Bebe Rexha) and "Zillionaire"
 Charlie Puth"We Don't Talk Anymore"
 Ne-Yo"What's Going On"
 Serayah"Look But Don't Touch"
 Jason Derulo"Kiss the Sky", "Whatcha Say", "Ridin' Solo", "Want to Want Me", "Wiggle" and "Talk Dirty"

Presenters
Ross Lynch and Gina Rodriguez—presented Choice Movie Actor: Sci-Fi/Fantasy
Bebe Rexha, Alessia Cara and Kelsea Ballerini—presented Choice TV Actor: Sci-Fi/Fantasy
Lea Michele and Bethany Mota—presented Choice TV: Drama
Cat Deeley and Maddie Ziegler—introduced the finalists of So You Think You Can Dance: The Next Generation
Sarah Hyland and John Stamos—presented Choice Summer TV Show
Terrence J and Katie Nolan—introduced Charlie Puth
Lana Parrilla and Paul Wesley—presented Choice TV: Comedy
Kobe Bryant—presented the Decade Award
Clayne Crawford and Damon Wayans—presented Choice Movie: Drama
Jessica Alba—introduced the families and survivors who were affected by gun violence and Ne-Yo
Hey Violet—presented Stride Mad Intense Winner Minute
Matthew Daddario and The Bella Twins—presented Choice Movie: Breakout Star
Anthony Anderson and Tracee Ellis Ross—presented Choice Movie Actress: Comedy
Mark Consuelos and Kylie Bunbury—introduced Serayah
Laura Marano and Maia Mitchell—presented Choice Web Stars: Male and Female

Winners and nominees
The first wave of nominations were announced on May 24, 2016. The second wave was announced on June 9, 2016. The third and final wave was announced on July 6, 2016. Winners are listed first, in bold.

Movies

Television

Music

Digital

Fashion

Sports

Miscellaneous

Controversy
Family and fans of slain singer Christina Grimmie expressed disappointment that Grimmie was not mentioned during the show, especially during the #StoptheViolence tribute, which was presented by actress Jessica Alba and singer Ne-Yo and honored the family members of teens who had died as a result of violence.

References

External links
 

2016 awards in the United States
2016 in Los Angeles
July 2016 events in the United States
2016